Ailsa is a 1994 film directed by Paddy Breathnach and starring Brendan Coyle and Andrea Irvine. His first feature film, it garnered Breathnach the Euskal Media Award for best new director at the San Sebastian International Film Festival. The film also received nominations at the Stockholm Film Festival and the Torino International Festival of Young Cinema.

The style and theme of Ailsa was generally perceived as "European".  It was released at a time when the Irish film industry was experiencing enormous growth.

Cast
 Brendan Coyle as Miles Butler
 Andrea Irvine as Sara
 Juliette Gruber as Campbell Rourke
 Gary Lydon as Jack
 Blanaid Irvine as Vera

References

External links
 

1994 films
English-language Irish films
Films scored by Dario Marianelli
Films directed by Paddy Breathnach
1994 directorial debut films
1990s English-language films